This is a list of notable bands and artists from Merseyside, North West England. For over fifty years, the area has had a thriving pop and rock music scene, particularly since The Beatles popularised Merseybeat.

0-9
28 Costumes
The 747s: 2006 indie group.

A
APAtT (a.P.A.t.T.): 2000s progressive pop/experimental rock band
A Flock of Seagulls: 1980s new wave/synthpop band
Afraid of Mice: 1980s new wave/post-punk band
Alexis Blue: 2000s indie pop group
Alpha Male Tea Party
Alterkicks: 2000s indie rock band led by singer/songwriter Martin Stilwell
Amsterdam: Led by singer/songwriter Ian Prowse
Anathema: Formerly a death/doom metal band and alternative rock
Antimatter
Apollo 440: 1990s dance act which had hits with "Ain't Talkin 'bout Dub" and "Stop the Rock"
Atomic Kitten: Girl group formed in 1997 by OMD's Andy McCluskey
Ian Astbury: Rock musician and songwriter best known as the lead vocalist for the rock band The Cult.
Aystar, rapper who recorded a 'Fire in the Booth' for Charlie Sloth.
Jacqui Abbott was the female lead singer with the band The Beautiful South after 1994, following the departure of Briana Corrigan. The band were arguably more successful with Abbott on board, releasing several Top 10 singles

B
Badfinger: Although originally formed in Swansea, two members came from Liverpool.
Banners: Michael Joseph Nelson, known under the stage name Banners is a singer-songwriter from Liverpool
The Bandits: 2000s blues rock band
BB Mak: 1998–2003 pop/rock band, biggest hit "Back Here" was No. 1 on the US Billboard AC chart for seven weeks; sold three million albums worldwide
The Beatles: 1960s rock band, widely regarded as the foremost and most influential music band in history
Benny Profane: 1985–1990 indie pop band
Big in Japan: 1970s punk band that launched the careers of Budgie, Ian Broudie, Bill Drummond, David Balfe, Jayne Casey and Holly Johnson
The Big Three: Merseybeat band managed by Brian Epstein
Cilla Black: 1960s singer discovered by Brian Epstein, later to become a successful television presenter
Black: 1980s singer-songwriter best known for the hit "Wonderful Life"
The Black Velvets: 2000s rock band
The Boo Radleys: 1980s/90s Britpop/indie rock band, biggest hit "Wake Up Boo!"
Peter Beckett is an English musician and songwriter who has written songs for many prominent recording artists, his own bands and solo work, and for several films. He is likely best known as the lead singer and guitarist for 1970s soft rock group Player, which scored a U.S. number 1 hit in 1977 with "Baby Come Back"
Buster

C
Jimmy Campbell known in the 1960s for bands such as The Kirbys and the 23rd Turnoff.
CamelPhat CamelPhat is a British DJ and production duo, consisting of Dave Whelan and Mike Di Scala, formed in Liverpool in 2004.
Carcass: 1990s death metal band and forebears of melodic death metal
Cast: 1990s Britpop group
Care
Cecil (band), rock band from Liverpool, active 1993–2000.
The Cheap Thrills 2010s indie rock band from Liverpool.
The Cherry Boys 1980s New wave band Byrne, Gunsun, Minns, Hughes
China Crisis: 1980s new wave band
The Christians: 1980s/90s soul-influenced sophisti-pop band
Circa Waves: indie rock band formed in Liverpool in 2013.
Clean Cut Kid: indie pop band
Clinic: 2000s acid punk band
Colonel Bagshot
The Coral: 2000s indie group inspired by old-fashioned country, 1960s-style psychedelia and folk
Peter Edward Clarke (born 21 August 1957, in St Helens, Merseyside), better known as Budgie, is an English drummer. His first recording was with The Slits in 1979. He then became the drummer of the influential band Siouxsie and the Banshees (1979–1996) and its side-project The Creatures (1981–2004).
Conan
Cook da Books: 1980s new wave band
The Crescent: 2000s indie band influenced by the La's
Crawlers (band), rock band, formed in 2018
Crucial Three: 1980s "supergroup in reverse" which launched the careers of Ian McCulloch, Julian Cope and Pete Wylie
The Cryin' Shames: 1960s pop group

D
Dalek I Love You: 1970s synthpop precursor to Teardrop Explodes, Orchestral Manoeuvres in the Dark & Big in Japan
Dead or Alive: 1980s synth/dance-pop band
The Dead 60s: Punk/ska/reggae band
Deaf School are an English art rock/new wave band, formed in Liverpool in 1973. Between 1976 and 1978 they recorded three albums for the Warner Brothers label, in an art rock style that had its roots in cabaret, moving towards a harder punk rock sound.
Carol Decker lead singer with T'Pau
The Dennisons: 1960s Merseybeat outfit. Had two singles in the UK Singles Chart in 1963 and 1964
Dragged into Sunlight: extreme metal band formed in 2006

E
Echo & the Bunnymen: 1980s post-punk band, one of the most successful and long-lived of the era
Ellery Bop: 1980s indie band
Jennifer Ellison: Reached number 6 in the UK Singles Chart in 2003 with "Baby I Don't Care".
Electrafixion: Echo & the Bunnymen > 1994 - 1997 <side-project
Engine: 1979–1997 boogie-rock trio
The Escorts: 1962–1967 band whose members later joined The Swinging Blue Jeans and The Hollies

F
The Farm: Indie dance band, famous for the track "All Together Now"
Faron's Flamingos: Merseybeat band whose members later graced The Peddlers and The Mojos
Rebecca Ferguson: X Factor finalist whose debut album went platinum in its first two weeks of release. Went on to sign an international deal with EMI to take her music worldwide
Flamingo 50
A Formal Sigh
The Fourmost: 1960s Merseybeat band, managed by Brian Epstein and recorded songs written by Lennon–McCartney
Frankie Goes to Hollywood: 1980s dance-pop band
Freeze Frame
Billy Fury

G
Gerry & the Pacemakers: 1960s beat group, most notable for their version of "You'll Never Walk Alone", which became an anthem for Liverpool F.C.
Gomez: Indie rock band active since the late 1990s, Mercury Prize winners

H
Half Man Half Biscuit: post-punk surrealist pop band from Tranmere, Birkenhead; formed 1985, disbanded 1986; reformed 1990, still active .
Hazey: rapper noted for a strong local accent, whose song "Packs and Potions" became hugely popular on TikTok and peaked at number 11 on the UK Singles Chart.
Her's: 2010s alternative pop duo
The Hideaways: 1960s Merseybeat band in which Ozzie Yue began his career.
Paul Heaton is an English singer-songwriter. He was a member of The Housemartins, who disbanded in 1988, and a member of The Beautiful South, who disbanded in 2007. He is pursuing a solo career.
Holy Barbarians: Ian Astbury side project, 1995 to 1997
Hooton Tennis Club: 2010s alternative slacker band
Hot Club de Paris: 2000s indie rock band

I
Ian and the Zodiacs
Icicle Works: 1980s power pop/new wave stalwarts, led by Ian McNabb. Reformed in 2006 for a 25th anniversary tour
It's Immaterial

J
Jamie Webster
Jemini
Johnny Boy
Holly Johnson: Former lead singer of Frankie Goes to Hollywood, had solo hits in the late 1980s
Simon Jones is an English bass guitarist. He played bass and provided occasional backing vocals for the English band The Verve.

K
Kingsize Taylor and the Dominoes
The KLF: Jimmy Cauty in the Electrionic  Band  music.
The Koobas 
Billy J. Kramer and The Dakotas: Performed as 'Billy J. Kramer and the Dakotas' and billed as a Merseybeat band when under Brian Epstein's management in the 1960s

L
The La's: Late 1980s to early 1990s pop/rock band
Ladytron: 2000s and 2010s electronic music band
The Lancashire Hotpots are a comedy folk band from St Helens, Merseyside (formerly part of Lancashire), formed in December 2006.
Lightning Seeds: Indie/pop band, whose frontman Ian Broudie wrote the "Three Lions" music for Euro '96
The Little Flames: 1960s-inspired indie band
The Liverbirds
Loathe: Metal band from Liverpool
The Lotus Eaters: Early–mid 1980s pop/new wave band. Emerged with another album in 2001 called Silentspace
Liverpool Express
The Listening Pool: Former members of Orchestral Manoeuvres in the Dark
Julian Lennon is a British musician. He is the only child of John Lennon and Cynthia Powell (his father's first wife)

M
Malik & the O.G's
Jim McCarty: best known as the drummer for The Yardbirds and Renaissance.
Marc Almond: lead singer for Soft Cell
Marseille: 1970s heavy metal band from Liverpool, featuring television celebrity Neil Buchanan
Marsha Ambrosius: Singer-songwriter, former member of the soul/R&B duo Floetry, she released her first solo album Late Nights & Early Mornings in 2011. Her debut album topped the Billboard R&B chart. Has been nominated for Grammy Awards
The Maybes?: Band active since 2001
George Melly: Jazz musician, writer and expert on surrealist art
The Mekano Set: Alternative Electro Post-Punk collective formed 2007
The Merseybeats
Mic Lowry, pop/R&B vocal group who have supported Justin Bieber
Miles Kane: Musician originally from the Wirral, best known as the co-frontman of The Last Shadow Puppets and former frontman of The Rascals. Formerly the vocalist and lead guitarist for The Rascals, but announced the band's break-up in August 2009. Pursuing a solo career, and continues to be part of his side-project, The Last Shadow Puppets. His debut solo album, Colour of the Trap, was released in May 2011
Modern Eon: Post-punk band active 1978–1981
The Mojos
The Moonies: alternative rock band
Nick McCabe  is an English musician best known as the lead guitarist of The Verve.
Multi Purpose Chemical: alternative metal band

N
 Brian Nash: Nasher, a former member of Frankie Goes to Hollywood, solo career since 1997

O
The Onset
Ooberman: Indie pop band (late 1990s–2007)
The Open: 5-piece indie band (2003–2006)
Orchestral Manoeuvres in the Dark: (aka OMD) Globally successful new wave/electronic band from Wirral
Our Kid: 1970s boy band whose hit "You Just Might See Me Cry" went Top 5 in the UK Singles Chart

P
Pardon Us: A pop-punk band formed from members of Flamingo 50 and Town Bike.
The Pale Fountains: Bacharach and Love-influenced early 1980s pop group, led by Mick Head. Later metamorphosed into Shack
Pele: 1990s Celtic pop outfit led by Ian Prowse. Released three albums on Polydor/M&G and had a number 1 hit, "Megalomania" in South Africa.
The Pies: Most famous for Liverpool graffiti -  Played Whisky a go go Hollywood 1993 to Georges hall gig 2016 still releasing music 
Pink Industry: post-punk band formed after Pink Military split up
Pink Military: post-punk band
Plastic Ono Band: band formed by John Lennon and Yoko Ono. 
Henry Priestman: Songwriter for The Christians and member of Yachts and It's Immaterial. Now has a solo career
Poisoned Electrick Head is an English psychedelic indie rock/punk band formed in 1986 in St Helens.

Q
The Quarrymen: skiffle group formed by John Lennon.

R
The Rascals: 2000s band from Hoylake (The Wirral)
The Real People: Proto-Britpop band from the early 1990s
The Real Thing: Soul band who sang the 1970s classic "You To Me Are Everything"
Red Flag: Liverpool-born and US-raised synthpop duo
The Remo Four: 1950s-1960s rock band
Revolutionary Army of the Infant Jesus
The Reynolds Girls: 1980s vocal duo signed to PWL
Rezonance Q
Rick Astley: 80s and 90s pop singer
River City People: a folk rock quartet formed in Liverpool in 1986 by vocalist Siobhan Maher, guitarist Tim Speed, his drummer brother Paul Speed and bassist Dave Snell
The Liverpool Roadrunners: 1960s band
The Room: Critically acclaimed (by John Peel and others) band from Liverpool, signed to Virgin 10, released three albums and several singles, one produced by Tom Verlaine, between 1980 and 1985
Rooney: Released three albums from 1998 to 2000 and recorded a Radio 1 John Peel session in 1999
The Royal Family and the Poor
Royal Liverpool Philharmonic Orchestra
The Runaways: UK band of the mid-1960s, better known as Bill Kenwright and the Runaways
Sir Simon Rattle OM CBE is an English conductor. He rose to international prominence during the 1980s and 1990s as conductor of the City of Birmingham Symphony Orchestra and since 2002 has been principal conductor of the Berlin Philharmonic (BPO)

S
S.F.X. Boys' Choir, Liverpool
The Sand Band: alternative folk band
The Scaffold: 1960s group featuring Mike McGear, Roger McGough and John Gorman. Had a number 1 with "Lily the Pink", and other hits with "Thank You Very Much", "Do You Remember?" and "Gin Gan Goolie" in the 1960s and "Liverpool Lou" in the 1970s
Scorpio Rising - 1990s indie rock group, whose style is inspired by Manchester's indie dance scene.
The Seal Cub Clubbing Club: Post-punk band
The Searchers: 1960s Merseybeat group. No. 1 hits include "Sweets For My Sweet", "Needles and Pins" and "Don't Throw Your Love Away"
Shack: Cult band led by Mick Head, formerly of The Pale Fountains. Influential on Britpop bands such as Oasis; Noel Gallagher repaid the debt by signing them to his record label
She Drew the Gun: are a 4-piece dreamy psych pop outfit.
Short Sharp Shock: Crossover hardcore/thrash band from Wirral
Siobhan Maher Kennedy: lead vocalist of River City People during the late 1980s and early 1990s, solo career since 2002
Skinny: 1995 to 1998 indie pop band later known as Monochrome
Smaller: Mid-1990s indie band featuring Digsy of Oasis fame
Sonia: Pop singer from the PWL stable. Born in Skelmersdale but mostly associated with Liverpool
Sound of Guns: Alternative Rock band formed in 2008
Space: 1990s indie band best known for "Female of the Species" and their six other Top 20 hit singles
Spider: new wave of British heavy metal (NWOBHM) band
The Spinners Liverpool folk band
The Spitfire Boys: punk band
The Stands: 2000s rock & roll band led by songwriter Howie Payne. Split in 2006
Stealing Sheep: pop band formed in 2010
Still Brickin: rapper who featured on Digga D's "Pump 101" which peaked at number 9 in the UK Singles Chart.
Sunday Jones: indie rock band
Rory Storm and the Hurricanes: Merseybeat group
Ringo Starr & His All-Starr Band. Super Group. 
Supercharge: 1970s funk/rock band, led by Albie Donnelly and featuring Ozzie Yue
The Swinging Blue Jeans: 1960s Merseybeat group. Top 3 hits include "Hippy Hippy Shake" and "You're No Good"
Terry Sylvester was the English guitarist/singer with The Escorts, The Swinging Blue Jeans (1966–69) and The Hollies. In the latter guise, he took on the high parts formerly sung by Graham Nash, who had left the band in December 1968

T
Levi Tafari
The Night Café: a British indie pop band
The Teardrop Explodes: Julian Cope led an ever-changing line-up mixing pop, new wave and psychedelia with commercial success. Split in 1982 after two albums
The Tempest: 1980s acoustic-pop band, signed to Magnet Records and produced by Glenn Tilbrook. Members included Ian Finney and ex-Prefab Sprout member Steve Dolder
To My Boy
Tokyo Adventures
Tramp Attack
Traveling Wilburys: A group that was founded by George Harrison. 
Tremz, real name Tremaine Wiltshire, leading figure in the "Scouse trap" movement of hip hop in a strong local accent.
The Troubadours: Liverpool indie band, known for the single "Gimme Love"
Two People

U
Ultrabeat are a British electronic music group from Liverpool, consisting of producer and vocalist Mike Di Scala and producers Ian Redman and Chris Henry
 The Undertakers: 1960s Merseybeat group, launchpad for the careers of the late Jackie Lomax (bass guitar), Chris Huston (lead guitar), the late Geoff Nugent (rhythm guitar), Brian Jones (tenor saxophone, member of the Glitter band) and the late Brian (Bugs) Pemberton (drums). Today's members are Brian Jones, Geoff Nugent, Bill Good and Jimmy O'Brien (formerly New Image and Rockin Horse). Lomax rejoined the band when he is home in Liverpool.
Urban Strawberry Lunch

V
Frankie Vaughan was an English singer of traditional pop music who issued more than 80 singles in his lifetime. He was known as "Mr. Moonlight" after one of his early hits
The Vernons Girls were an English musical ensemble of female vocalists

W
Wah!: Pete Wylie vehicle, variously known as Wah! Heat and The Mighty Wah!
Walkingseeds: alternative rock band formed in 1986
Wave Machines: Indie band (2007–present)
Jane Weaver: Female solo artist born in Liverpool and raised in Widnes.
The Wild Swans: Post-punk/new wave band
Wimple Winch: freakbeat band
 Where's the Beach: Techno band who recorded three John Peel sessions and had Single Of The Week in NME for their third single "Sex Slave Zombie"
The Wombats: Indie rock band formed in 2003 consisting of Matthew Murphy, Tord Overland Knudsen and Daniel Haggis. Best known for their 2007 hit Let's Dance To Joy Division. 
Kathryn Williams released her first album, Dog Leap Stairs on her own Caw Records label in 1999 with a budget of £80. The follow-up, Little Black Numbers, garnered a Mercury Prize nomination in 2000
Cliff Williams Bassist with AC/DC. Lived in Hoylake.
Wings: A band that  was founded by Paul McCartney. 
WSTR

Y
Yachts: power pop/new wave band

Z
The Zutons: 2000s indie group inspired by 1960s psychedelia
Zombina and the Skeletones: 2000s pop punk band

References

 
Culture in Merseyside
Merseyside
Merseyside